Nine Boys, One Heart (French: Neuf garçons, un coeur) is a 1948 French musical film directed by Georges Friedland and starring Édith Piaf, Lucien Baroux and Marcel Vallée.

It was shot at the Billancourt Studios in Paris. The film's sets were designed by the art director Lucien Aguettand.

Cast
 Édith Piaf as Christine
 Les Compagnons de la Chanson as Eux-mêmes / Themselves
 Lucien Baroux as Victor
 Marcel Vallée as Le patron du Paradise 
 Elisabeth Wells as Lisa
 Lucien Nat as Le monsieur

References

Bibliography 
 Rège, Philippe. Encyclopedia of French Film Directors, Volume 1. Scarecrow Press, 2009.

External links 
 

1948 films
French musical drama films
1940s musical drama films
1940s French-language films
Films directed by Georges Friedland
Films set in Paris
Films shot at Billancourt Studios
French black-and-white films
1948 drama films
Films scored by Norbert Glanzberg
1940s French films